The 1982 Cornell Big Red football team was an American football team that represented Cornell University during the 1982 NCAA Division I-AA football season. Cornell tied for fourth place in the Ivy League. 

In its sixth and final season under head coach Bob Blackman, the team compiled a 4–6 record but outscored opponents 211 to 202. Team captains were Steve Duca and Dan Suren. 

Cornell's 3–4 conference record earned it part of a four-way tie for fourth place in the Ivy League standings. The Big Red outscored Ivy opponents 165 to 164. 

This was Cornell's first year in Division I-AA, after having competed in the top-level Division I-A and its predecessors since 1887.

Cornell played its home games at Schoellkopf Field in Ithaca, New York.

Schedule

References

Cornell
Cornell Big Red football seasons
Cornell Big Red football